Manhole is a 2014 South Korean thriller directed by Shin Jae-young.

Plot
The serial killer Soo-chul (Jung Kyung-ho) has been terrorizing a neighborhood in Seoul, and in the span of 6 months, 10 people have disappeared without a trace. He uses a manhole to trap his victims. His latest abductee is Soo-jung (Kim Sae-ron), a 14-year-old girl, and her older sister Yeon-seo (Jung Yu-mi) is desperate to find her before time runs out.

Cast
Jung Kyung-ho as Soo-chul
Jung Yu-mi as Yeon-seo 
Kim Sae-ron as Soo-jung
Choi Deok-moon as Kim Jong-ho, taxi driver
Jo Dal-hwan as Pil-gyu, policeman 
Lee Young-yoo as Kim Song-yi, Jong-ho's daughter
Yoon Chan-young as Soo-chul (young)
Sung Yu-bin as Feral boy
Kim Bin-woo as Female victim
Seo Hyun-woo as Policeman
Kim Mi-hee as Policewoman
Kim Gu-taek as Choi

References

External links
 

South Korean thriller films
South Korean serial killer films
2014 films
2010s South Korean films